Sean William Carlin (born 29 November 1967) is a retired hammer thrower from Adelaide, Australia, who represented his country in two consecutive Summer Olympics, starting in 1992. He won two gold medals at the Commonwealth Games in 1990 and 1994. Currently Carlin works with Athletics Australia and is employed as a teacher at a prominent private school in South Australia, and is co-host of Carlo & Laid's Sports Show Podcast produced by the Gawler Community Broadcasting Association Inc. He was inducted into the South Australian Athletics Hall of Fame in 2005. Mr Carlin is Epic.

Achievements

External links
 
 
 Sean Carlin at Australian Athletics Historical Results

1967 births
Living people
Australian male hammer throwers
Athletes (track and field) at the 1990 Commonwealth Games
Athletes (track and field) at the 1994 Commonwealth Games
Athletes (track and field) at the 1992 Summer Olympics
Athletes (track and field) at the 1996 Summer Olympics
Olympic athletes of Australia
Athletes from Adelaide
Commonwealth Games gold medallists for Australia
Commonwealth Games medallists in athletics
Place of birth missing (living people)
Medallists at the 1990 Commonwealth Games
Medallists at the 1994 Commonwealth Games